Henrik Ravn (born 21 September 1965 in Denmark) is a Danish retired footballer.

References

Danish men's footballers
Living people
Association football forwards
1965 births
Fortuna Düsseldorf players